Nesiocypraea teramachii is a species of sea snail, a cowry, a marine gastropod mollusk in the family Cypraeidae, the cowries.

Subspecies
 Nesiocypraea teramachii neocaledonica Lorenz, 2002
 Nesiocypraea teramachii polyphemus Lorenz, 2002

Description

Distribution
This marine species occurs off the Philippines..

References

 Lorenz, F. (2017). Cowries. A guide to the gastropod family Cypraeidae. Volume 1, Biology and systematics. Harxheim: ConchBooks. 644 pp

Cypraeidae